is a town located in Akita, Japan. , the town had an estimated population of 8317 in 3870 households and a population density of 39 persons per km2.

Geography
Gojōme is located in coastal plains of northwestern Akita Prefecture, with mountainous areas in the east and urban areas and rural areas in the west. It is approximately 30 km north of the city of Akita.

Neighboring municipalities
Akita Prefecture
Akita
Ikawa
Ōgata
Hachirōgata
Mitane
Kamikoani

Climate
Gojōme has a Humid continental climate (Köppen climate classification Dfa) with large seasonal temperature differences, with warm to hot (and often humid) summers and cold (sometimes severely cold) winters. Precipitation is significant throughout the year, but is heaviest from August to October.

Demographics
Per Japanese census data, the population of Gojōme peaked at around the year 1960 and has been in steady decline since then.

History
The area of present-day Gojōme was part of ancient Dewa Province, dominated by the Satake clan during the Edo period, who ruled Kubota Domain under the Tokugawa shogunate. The village of Gojōme was created on April 1, 1889 within Minamiakita District, Akita with the establishment of the modern municipalities system. It was elevated to town status on January 18, 1896.

Government
Gojōme has a mayor-council form of government with a directly elected mayor and a unicameral town council of 14 members. Gojōme, together with the city of Noshiro and the other municipalities of Yamamoto District contributes four members to the Akita Prefectural Assembly. In terms of national politics, the town is part of Akita 2nd district of the lower house of the Diet of Japan.

Economy
The economy of Gojōme is based primarily on agriculture. The town is known for the Morning Market on weekends, which claims a history of over 500 years.

Education
Gojōme has one public elementary school and one public middle school operated by the town government. The town has one public high school operated by the Akita Prefectural Board of Education.

Transportation

Railway
The Ōu Main Line passes through the Okawa neighborhood of the town, but there is no station. In the past, the Akita Chuo Kotsu Line linked Gojōme to Hachirōgata Station in Hachirōgata, but the line was abolished in 1969.

Highway

Noted people from Gojōme 
Masashi Kudo, professional boxer
Yasaburo Sugawara, wrestler
Wakakoma Kenzo, sumo wrestler

References

External links

Official Website 

Towns in Akita Prefecture